Thirumoorthy is a 1995 Indian Tamil-language action film written and directed by Pavithran. The film stars Vijayakanth and Ravali, with Anandaraj, Rajan P. Dev, Manorama, Shenbagam, Senthil and Janagaraj playing supporting roles. It was released on 11 May 1995, and emerged a box office hit.

Plot 

Moorthy is a lorry driver, who lives with his mother Ram Aatha and often confronts the criminal Govindan. Moorthy and Uma fall in love with each other. One day, her father has a heart attack, when Moorthy and Uma rush him to the hospital, the roads are blocked by a local political party. Her father dies; an enraged Moorthy clashes with the political party leader Sigamani in public. Later, Govindan joins his party and stands in the election as well as Moorthy. In the meantime, Moorthy and Uma get married. The corrupt politician Sigamani orders to kill Govindan and blames the innocent Moorthy. What transpires later forms the crux of the story.

Cast 

Vijayakanth as Moorthy
Ravali as Uma
Anandaraj as Govindan
Rajan P. Dev as Sigamani
Manorama as Ram Aatha
Shenbagam as Geetha
Senthil as Azhagesan
Janagaraj as Uma's father
R. Sundarrajan as Geetha's brother
Rajkumar
Jojo
Sangeetha as Lakshmi
Srija
Pasi Sathya
Jyothi Meena
Lakshmi Rathan
Ennatha Kannaiya
Pasi Narayanan
Omakuchi Narasimhan
T. N. B. Rajendran
A. N. Babu
Tirupur Ramasamy as Ramasamy
Kullamani as Peruchazhi
Karuppu Subbiah
Easwaran
Samraj
Ram-Lakshman
Chelladurai
Ghajini
Kalyan

Soundtrack 
The music was composed by Deva, with lyrics by Vaali. The song "Senguruvi Senguruvi" is set to Anandabhairavi raga.

Reception 
R. P. R. of Kalki praised Krishna's choreography as the sole positive of the film.

References

External links 

1990s Tamil-language films
1995 action films
1995 films
Films scored by Deva (composer)
Indian action films